The 2012 United States presidential election in Massachusetts took place on November 6, 2012, as part of the 2012 United States presidential election in which all 50 states plus the District of Columbia participated. Massachusetts voters chose 11 electors to represent them in the Electoral College via a popular vote pitting incumbent Democratic President Barack Obama and his running mate, Vice President Joe Biden, against Republican challenger and former Massachusetts Governor Mitt Romney and his running mate, Congressman Paul Ryan.

Obama and Biden won Massachusetts with 60.65% of the popular vote to Romney's and Ryan's 37.51%, thus winning the state's 11 electoral votes by a 23.14% margin of victory, despite Massachusetts being Romney's home state, as whose governor he had served from 2003 to 2007. This was the first time a presidential candidate lost his home state since Al Gore lost Tennessee in the 2000 election. Romney also became the first Republican candidate to lose his home state since Richard Nixon lost his then-home state of New York to Hubert Humphrey in 1968.

Massachusetts had been a Democratic-leaning state since 1928, and a Democratic stronghold since 1960, and has maintained extremely large Democratic margins since 1996. Even fending off one of the state's own former governors, Mitt Romney. Massachusetts has not voted for a Republican presidential candidate since Ronald Reagan in 1984. The 2012 election was also the sixth consecutive one (since 1992) in which the Democratic presidential candidate swept every one of the state's 14 counties. Romney became the first candidate since Theodore Roosevelt, one hundred years earlier, to win an electoral vote, but no counties in his home state. Romney also became the first major party nominee to lose his or her home state by twenty or more percentage points in 80 years, which would happen again four years later when Donald Trump lost his home state of New York by 22 points.

Nevertheless, Romney's 37.51% vote share still stands (as of the 2020 election) as the highest Republican vote share in the Bay State since 1988. Romney's 4.2% defeat in Plymouth County represents, as of 2020, the closest a Republican has come to carrying any of Massachusetts' counties since 1988. This was also the first and, as of 2020, only election since 1984 in which the former Republican stronghold of Barnstable County was not decided by double digits.

The 2012 presidential election marks the most recent cycle that Romney would stand for public office as a resident of Massachusetts.  He would be on the ballot again in 2018, but as a candidate for United States Senator from Utah. As of the 2020 United States Presidential election, this is the last election Massachusetts voted more Republican than New York. Despite Romney's expected wide loss, this is to date the best performance of a Republican presidential candidate in Massachusetts since George H. W. Bush in 1988, when he garnered more than 40% of the state's  votes and won four of its counties (making him the most recent Republican to win any Massachusetts counties). Romney outperformed George W. Bush's vote share in 2004 by 0.73%, while Obama underperformed John Kerry's vote share by 1.29%. Obama's 23% margin was the smallest margin since 1992.

As of 2022, this is the last time that the towns of Boxford, Boylston, Cohasset, Dover, Dunstable, Duxbury, Easton, Foxborough, Georgetown, Hamilton, Hingham, Holden, Hopkinton, Lancaster, Lunenburg, Marshfield,  Medfield, Norfolk, North Andover, North Attleborough, North Reading, Norwell, Paxton, Princeton, Sandwich,  Scituate, Sturbridge, Topsfield, Upton, Walpole, Wenham, West Boylston, Westwood, Wilmington, and Wrentham voted Republican and the last time that the cities of Agawam and Palmer and the towns of Acushnet, Blackstone, Chester, Freetown, Huntington, Leicester, Ludlow, Monroe, Monson, New Braintree, Russell, Swansea, Templeton, Wales, Ware, Warren, and Winchendon voted Democratic in a presidential election.

Primaries

Democratic
 

Incumbent president Barack Obama won the Massachusetts Democratic Primary with 81% of the vote. He received no official opposition in the primary, with the other 19% of the vote going to write-in candidates. Through the primary and district caucuses, he won all of the state's 110 pledged delegates, which voted for him at the 2012 Democratic National Convention in Charlotte, North Carolina (the state also had 26 superdelegates).

Republican

The 2012 Massachusetts Republican presidential primary was held on March 6, 2012. Among the 41 delegates to the Republican National Convention, 38 are awarded proportionately among candidates getting at least 15% of the vote statewide, and another three super delegates are unbound. As expected, Romney won Massachusetts by a landslide. He won the plurality in every town but 10 (Rick Santorum won seven, Ron Paul won two, and no candidate won one), and earned the majority in all but 53.

Green-Rainbow

The 2012 Massachusetts Green-Rainbow presidential primary was held on March 6, 2012.

General election
Candidate Ballot Access:
 Mitt Romney/Paul Ryan, Republican
 Barack Obama/Joseph Biden, Democratic
 Jill Stein/Cheri Honkala, Green
 Gary Johnson/James P. Gray, Libertarian

Results

By county

Resulys by Municipality

Results by congressional district
Obama won all 9 congressional districts.

See also
 United States presidential elections in Massachusetts
 2012 Republican Party presidential debates and forums
 2012 Republican Party presidential primaries
 Results of the 2012 Republican Party presidential primaries
 Massachusetts Republican Party

Notes

References

External links
 The Green Papers: for Massachusetts
 The Green Papers: Major state elections in chronological order
 Official Results for 2012 Election in Massachusetts

2012
United States President
Massachusetts